Amy Davidson Sorkin (formerly Amy Davidson; born 1969 or 1970) is an American author, journalist and magazine editor.

Biography
Amy Davidson was born in 1969 or 1970 and grew up in New York City. She graduated from Hunter College High School, and attended Harvard University, where she received an AB in Social Studies. Before joining The New Yorker, she lived and worked in Germany.

Davidson Sorkin joined The New Yorker magazine in 1995. In 1997, she became co-deputy head of the magazine's fact-checking department; in 2000, she was named an associate editor; in 2003, she was named senior editor. She became a staff writer in 2015 and focuses on politics and international affairs.  Her editing contributions to The New Yorker have won the National Magazine Award and the George Polk Award.  Davidson Sorkin is a member of the Council on Foreign Relations.

Personal life
Amy Davidson and David James Sorkin, the general counsel of Kohlberg Kravis Roberts, were married on June 24, 2017, in a Jewish ceremony in Manhattan at the New-York Historical Society. Subsequently, she began to publish under the name Amy Davidson Sorkin.

Davidson Sorkin's first marriage ended with the death of her husband.

Bibliography

Essays and reporting

Columns from newyorker.com
Close Read
 
 
 
 
 

Conversation
 

Daily Comment
 
 

New Yorker Blog
 

New Yorker Festival
 
 

News Desk
 

Q. & A.
 
 
 
 
 
 
 
———————
Notes

References

Living people
American magazine editors
The New Yorker editors
Jewish American journalists
American women journalists
Hunter College High School alumni
Harvard College alumni
Women magazine editors
Year of birth missing (living people)
21st-century American Jews
21st-century American women